Hahn Field Archeological District is a registered historic district near Newtown, Ohio, listed in the National Register of Historic Places on October 29, 1974.

Historic uses 
Camp
Graves/Burials

Notes 

Fort Ancient culture
Pre-Columbian cultural areas
Archaeological sites in Ohio
Pre-Columbian archaeological sites
Archaeological sites on the National Register of Historic Places in Ohio
Historic districts on the National Register of Historic Places in Ohio
Archaeological sites in Hamilton County, Ohio
National Register of Historic Places in Hamilton County, Ohio